A basketball is a spherical ball used in games of the same name. High school and junior leagues normally use NCAA, NBA or WNBA sized balls.

Aside from the court and the baskets, the basketball is the only piece of equipment necessary to play the game of basketball. During the game, the ball must be bounced continuously (dribbling), thrown through the air to other players (passing) or thrown towards the basket (shooting). Therefore, the ball must be very durable and easy to hold on to. The ball is also used to perform tricks (sometimes called freestyling), the most common of which are spinning the ball on the tip of one's index finger, dribbling in complex patterns, rolling the ball over one's shoulder, or performing aerobatic maneuvers with the ball while executing a slam dunk, most notably in the context of a slam dunk contest.

Characteristics
Nearly all basketballs have an inflatable inner rubber bladder, generally wrapped in layers of fiber and then covered with a  surface made either from leather (traditional), rubber, or a synthetic composite. As in most inflatable balls, there is a small opening that allows the pressure to be increased or decreased.

The surface of the ball is nearly always divided by "ribs" that are recessed below the surface of the ball in a variety of configurations and are generally a contrasting color. An orangish surface with black ribs and a possible logo is the traditional color scheme of basketballs but they are sold in various colors.  Most famous of these variations, a red/white/blue basketball, was used for the American Basketball Association, the Harlem Globetrotters, and as the "money ball" in the NBA All-Star Weekend's Three Point Contest.

Balls are generally designated for indoor (generally made of leather or absorbent composites), or all-surface use (generally made of rubber or durable composites, also known as indoor/outdoor balls). Indoor balls tend to be more expensive than all-surface balls due to the cost of materials. In addition, brand new all-leather indoor balls must be "broken in" first to achieve optimal grip before use in competition. The abrasiveness of asphalt and the dirt and moisture present in an outdoor setting will usually ruin an indoor ball within a very short period of time, which is why an indoor/outdoor ball is recommended for recreational players. Outdoor balls are commonly made from rubber to cope with rougher conditions, and they need to be filled with more air to retain a suitable level of air pressure in colder weather.

Sizes
Different sizes are used for different age groups. The common standards are:

Note that the ball used for all competitions (men's, women's, and mixed) in the formalized halfcourt game of 3x3 combines characteristics of the size 6 and size 7 balls. Its circumference is that of a size 6 ball, but its weight is that of a size 7.

History

In early December 1891, the chairman of the physical education department at the School for Christian Workers (now Springfield College) in Springfield, Massachusetts, instructed physical education teacher James Naismith, to invent a new game to entertain the school's athletes in the winter season. Naismith assembled his class of 18 young men, appointed captains of two nine-player teams, and set in motion the first-ever basketball game, played with a soccer ball and two peach baskets tacked to either end of the gymnasium.

The first purpose-built basketballs were made from panels of leather stitched together with a rubber bladder inside. A cloth lining was added to the leather for support and uniformity. A molded version of the early basketball was invented in 1942. For many years, leather was the material of choice for basketball coverings, however, in the late 1990s, synthetic composite materials were put forth and have rapidly gained acceptance in most leagues, although the NBA's game balls still use real leather (outside of a brief experiment with a microfiber composite ball in 2006 that was not well received).

From 1967 through 1976, the American Basketball Association (ABA) used a distinctive red, white and blue basketball. It is used in the NBA's three point contest.

Notable basketball manufacturers

See also
List of inflatable manufactured goods

References 

Balls
Basketball equipment
Inflatable manufactured goods
American inventions